Sahura Mallick was an Indian politician belonging to the Indian National Congress. He was elected as a member of Orissa Legislative Assembly in 1974, 1980, and 1995. He died on 16 August 2019 at the age of 85.

References

2019 deaths
Indian National Congress politicians
Odisha MLAs 1974–1977
Odisha MLAs 1980–1985
Odisha MLAs 1995–2000
1930s births
Indian National Congress politicians from Odisha